The Bristol Rovers Player of the Year award has been presented annually to the player voted the best in the preceding season by the fans of Bristol Rovers Football Club. The winning player has been awarded a trophy by the Bristol Rovers Supporters club every year since 1983, and in 2018 the Football Club also began naming their own player of the year at an end-of-season awards dinner.

Bristol Rovers Supporters' Club player of the year
The first trophy was presented in 1983, but due to there being little space to engrave the names of any more winners the supporters' club commissioned a new trophy in 2018, which was named the Geoff Dunford Memorial Trophy in honour of the former football club chairman who had died the previous year.

Notes:
 Footballing nationality is defined as the national team the player has represented at senior or youth level, or the player's country of birth where they have never played for a national team.
 Age shown is the players age at the beginning of the season during which they won the player of the year award.
 All winners from 1983 to 2018 are from Byrne & Jay (2018).

Players who have won more than once
Four players have won the award on more than one occasion. The record for most wins belongs to Stuart Campbell, who was player of the year in 2008, 2010 and 2011, while three other players have won the award twice.

Number of wins by nationality

Number of wins by position

Bristol Rovers Football Club Player of the Year
Bristol Rovers Football Club held their inaugural end of season awards dinner in 2018, where they presented their own player of the year award. This went to midfielder Liam Sercombe.

Comparison of Supporters' Club and Football Club winners

References

Bibliography

Bristol Rovers F.C.
Association football player of the year awards by club in England
Association football player non-biographical articles